IC 1011 is a barred spiral galaxy with apparent magnitude of 14.7, and with a redshift of z=0.02564 (SIMBAD) or 0.025703 (NASA), yielding a distance of 100 to 120 megaparsecs. Its light has taken 349.5 million years to travel to Earth. IC 1011's calculated age is approximately 12.95 billion years. The IC designation comes from the Index Catalogue.

See also
 Lists of galaxies

References
 IC 1011, Sky-Map.org
 IC1011 Galaxy, SkyFactory.org

Footnotes

External links
 IC 1011 seds.org
 IC 1011 seds.org
 seds.org
 IC 1011 Vizier
 IC 1011 NASA Extragalactic Database
 NGC/IC

Virgo (constellation)
Elliptical galaxies
1011
51662
+00-37-008
J14280456